Amnista was a town of ancient Caria. Its name does not appear in ancient authors but is inferred from inscriptions.
 
Its site is located near Söğüt, Asiatic Turkey.

References

Populated places in ancient Caria
Former populated places in Turkey